Gilchin is a rural locality (a selo) in Razdolnensky Selsoviet of Tambovsky District, Amur Oblast, Russia. The population was 381 as of 2018. There are 6 streets.

Geography 
Gilchin is located on the Gilchin River, 34 km southwest of Tambovka (the district's administrative centre) by road. Razdolnoye is the nearest rural locality.

References 

Rural localities in Tambovsky District, Amur Oblast